During the 2018–19 season, Getafe CF participated in La Liga and the Copa del Rey. The season covered a period from 1 July 2018 to 30 June 2019.

Players

Reserve team

Out on loan

Transfers

In

Out

Competitions

Overall

La Liga

League table

Results summary

Results by round

Matches

Copa del Rey

Round of 32

Round of 16

Quarter-finals

Statistics

Appearances and goals
Last updated on 18 May 2019

|-
! colspan=14 style=background:#dcdcdc; text-align:center|Goalkeepers

|-
! colspan=14 style=background:#dcdcdc; text-align:center|Defenders

|-
! colspan=14 style=background:#dcdcdc; text-align:center|Midfielders

|-
! colspan=14 style=background:#dcdcdc; text-align:center|Forwards

|-
! colspan=14 style=background:#dcdcdc; text-align:center| Players who have made an appearance or had a squad number this season but have left the club
|-

|}

Goalscorers

References

Getafe CF seasons
Getafe